Lichnanthe is a genus of bumble bee scarab beetles in the family Glaphyridae. There are about 10 described species in Lichnanthe.

Species
These 10 species belong to the genus Lichnanthe:
 Lichnanthe albipilosa Carlson, 1980
 Lichnanthe apina Carlson, 1980
 Lichnanthe brachyscelis Carlson, 1980
 Lichnanthe cooperi (Horn, 1867)
 Lichnanthe defuncta (Wickham, 1910)
 Lichnanthe lupina LeConte, 1856
 Lichnanthe rathvoni (LeConte, 1863)
 Lichnanthe ursina (LeConte, 1861) (bumblebee scarab)
 Lichnanthe vulpina (Hentz, 1827) (cranberry root grub)

References

Further reading

 
 

Glaphyridae
Articles created by Qbugbot